Olaf Brandt (born 2 July 1971) is a German wrestler. He competed in the men's Greco-Roman 52 kg at the 1992 Summer Olympics.

References

External links
 

1971 births
Living people
German male sport wrestlers
Olympic wrestlers of Germany
Wrestlers at the 1992 Summer Olympics
People from Greifswald
Sportspeople from Mecklenburg-Western Pomerania